Leo Willis (5 January 1890 – 10 April 1952) was an American actor who began his career in the silent era. He played mainly tough guys and comic villains, notably opposite Harold Lloyd, Charley Chase, and Laurel and Hardy at the Hal Roach Studios.

Selected filmography

 The Italian (1915)
 Hell's Hinges (1915)
 The Return of Draw Egan (1916)
 One Shot Ross (1917)
 Bull's Eye (1917)
 A Regular Fellow (1919)
 The Toll Gate (1920)
 The Rent Collector (1921)
 Three Word Brand (1921)
 The Timber Queen (1922)
 Broken Chains (1922)
 Wild Bill Hickok (1923)
 Near Dublin (1924)
 Jubilo, Jr. (1924)
 Short Kilts (1924)
 The White Sheep (1924)
 Isn't Life Terrible? (1925)
 A Hero of the Big Snows (1926)
 The Tough Guy (1926)
 The Kid Brother (1927)
 Call of the Cuckoo (1927)
 Flying Elephants (1928)
 Their Purple Moment (1928)
 The Hoose-Gow (1929)
 Below Zero (1930)
 Pardon Us (1931)
 The Kid from Spain (1932)
 The Live Ghost (1934)
 The Gold Ghost (1934)
 The Bohemian Girl (1936)

External links

 

1890 births
1952 deaths
Hal Roach Studios actors
American male film actors
American male silent film actors
20th-century American male actors
Male actors from Oklahoma